The Jive Collection Volume 2: Kool Moe Dee is a third compilation album by American rapper Kool Moe Dee. It was released on June 27, 1995, through Jive Records, making it his second compilation album on the label. It is composed of twelve songs from Kool Moe Dee's previous albums: Kool Moe Dee (1986), How Ya Like Me Now (1987), Knowledge Is King (1989), Funke, Funke Wisdom (1991) and Greatest Hits (1993).

Track listing

References

External links

Kool Moe Dee albums
1995 compilation albums
Jive Records compilation albums